Tamás Tűz (18 April 1916 – 7 April 1992) was a Hungarian poet, writer, Catholic priest.

He spent time in a Soviet concentration camp during the Second World War. After the Hungarian Revolution of 1956, he went to Canada.

22 volumes, one of which is in English: On Restless Wings (1966). English translations of his poems were also published in the anthology The Sound of Time (Lethbridge, 1974).

References
Új magyar irodalmi lexikon III. (P–Zs), Budapest, 1994
Hungarian Studies Review, Vol. VIII, No. 1 (Spring 1981)

1916 births
1992 deaths
Hungarian male poets
20th-century Hungarian poets
20th-century Hungarian male writers